San Marino has participated in the Junior Eurovision Song Contest three times since their debut in the  contest. San Marino RTV (SMRTV), a member organisation of the European Broadcasting Union, is responsible for San Marino's participation.

History

San Marino had previously attempted to participate in the contest in 2011, in Yerevan, Armenia, however the national broadcaster withdrew before the contest as they had not found a representative in time. In 2013 and 2015, San Marino selected its entrant in an internally, while in 2014 it used "Vocine nuove Castrocaro" a selection.

According to Giovanni, the announcer of the Sammarinese points in 2013, San Marino used a jury.

In 2015, Michele Perniola, Sammarinese representative in 2013, and Anita Simoncini, a member of girlband The Peppermints who participated in 2014, were chosen together to perform in the Eurovision Song Contest 2015.

Participation overview

Photogallery

Commentators and spokespersons

See also 
 San Marino in the Eurovision Song Contest

References 

Countries in the Junior Eurovision Song Contest